Katherine Thomas (born June 6, 1966), best known by her stage name The Great Kat, is an American musician best known for her thrash metal interpretations of well-known pieces of classical music. Most feature her using the electric guitar, but on some she uses the violin. Thomas is a classically trained violinist, graduating from the Juilliard School and touring for a time playing conventional classical music before crossing over to metal.

Guitar One magazine listed her as one of the "Fastest Shredders of All Time".  Her classical background, technical skills and self-promotion are sometimes compared to Yngwie Malmsteen. In an interview in metallian.com she claimed to be the reincarnation of Beethoven.

Her public persona, as portrayed in her publicity photos and videos, is mainly compared to that of a dominatrix, albeit in an over-the-top, tongue-in-cheek manner.

In 1990, Swiss black metal band Mordor recorded for their first demo tape "Odes" a tribute song for Thomas, titled "The Great Kat Is God".

Discography 
 1986 – Satan Says (demo)
 1987 – Worship Me or Die!
 1990 – Beethoven on Speed
 1996 – Digital Beethoven on Cyberspeed (EP)
 1997 – Guitar Goddess (EP)
 1998 – Bloody Vivaldi (EP)
 2000 – Rossini's Rape (EP)
 2002 – Wagner's War (EP)
 2005 – Extreme Guitar Shred (DVD)
 2008 – Total Insanity (compilation)

References

External links 
 Official website
 'Favourable' listener review of Wagner's War
 UnRated Magazine Beethoven's Guitar Shred
  Interview from Tuned-Out.com in Detroit. Reviews of Castration video with Kat's responses
 Music Legends Interview with The Great Kat

Living people
American women heavy metal singers
American heavy metal guitarists
American violinists
Juilliard School alumni
1966 births
Lead guitarists
English emigrants to the United States
People from Swindon
20th-century American guitarists
21st-century violinists
20th-century American women guitarists
21st-century American women